Marine Pavilion may refer to:

Marine Pavilion, a villa in the Royal Pavilion in Brighton, England, designed by Henry Holland
Marine Pavilion (Queens), the 19th century hotel